Kevin Hill (born June 27, 1986) is a Canadian snowboarder. He competes primarily in snowboard cross and represented Canada in this event at the 2014 Winter Olympics in Sochi and the 2018 Winter Olympic Games in PyeongChang.

In January 2022, Hill was named to Canada's 2022 Olympic team.

Notable international results

See also

FIS Snowboard World Cup
X Games

References

External links
 
 
 
 
 
Kevin Hill at Canada Snowboard
Kevin Hill interview at CBC
Kevin Hill wins gold in Men’s Snowboarder X - Winter X Games at YouTube

1986 births
Living people
Canadian male snowboarders
People from Chilliwack
Sportspeople from British Columbia
Snowboarders at the 2014 Winter Olympics
Snowboarders at the 2018 Winter Olympics
Snowboarders at the 2022 Winter Olympics
Olympic snowboarders of Canada
X Games athletes